Xanthophyllum beccarianum is a tree in the family Polygalaceae. It is named for the Italian botanist Odoardo Beccari.

Description
The bark is grey-green and smooth. The flowers are orange-red when dry.

Distribution and habitat
Xanthophyllum beccarianum is endemic to Borneo. Its habitat is mixed dipterocarp forests from sea-level to  altitude.

References

beccarianum
Endemic flora of Borneo
Trees of Borneo
Plants described in 1896